Akatsuka Station is the name of multiple train stations in Japan:

 Akatsuka Station (Ibaraki) (赤塚駅)
 Akatsuka Station (Shimane) (明塚駅)
 Chikatetsu-Akatsuka Station (地下鉄赤塚駅)
 Shimo-Akatsuka Station (下赤塚駅)